The Bell H-13 Sioux is an American single-engine light helicopter built by Bell Helicopter and manufactured by Westland Aircraft under license for the British military as the Sioux AH.1 and HT.2.

Development

In 1947, the United States Army Air Forces (later the United States Air Force) ordered the improved Bell Model 47A. Most were designated YR-13 and three winterized versions were designated YR-13A. The United States Army first ordered Bell 47s in 1948 under the designation H-13. These would later receive the name Sioux.

Initially, the United States Navy procured several Bell 47s, designated HTL-1, between 1947 and 1958. The United States Coast Guard evaluated this model, and procured two HTL-1s for multi-mission support in the New York Harbor. The most common U.S. Navy version of the 47 was designated the HTL-4, and dispenses with the fabric covering on the tail boom. The U.S. Coast Guard procured three HTL-5s in 1952 (similar to the HTL-4 but powered by a Franklin O-335-5 engine) and used these until 1960. The Coast Guard procured two of Bell's Model 47G and designated them HUL-1G in 1959.

The H-13 was one of the principal helicopters used by the U.S. Army during the Korean War, with the H-13D variant being the most prevalent. During the war it was used in a wide variety of roles including observation, reconnaissance, and medivac. It was also used as an observation helicopter early in the Vietnam War, before being replaced by the Hughes OH-6 Cayuse in 1966.

The Bell 47 was ordered by the British Army as the Sioux to meet specification H.240, with licensed production by Westland Helicopters. In order to comply with the terms of its licence agreement with Sikorsky Aircraft, which prevented it building a U.S. competitor's aircraft, Westland licensed the Model 47 from Agusta, who had purchased a license from Bell. the first contract was for 200 helicopters. The first 50 helicopters of the contract were built by Agusta at Gallarate in Italy followed by 150 built by Westland at Yeovil. The first Westland Sioux made its maiden flight on 9 March 1965.

Design

The Sioux is a three-seat observation and basic training helicopter. In 1953 the Bell 47G design was introduced. It can be recognized by the full "soap bubble" canopy (as its designer Arthur M. Young termed it), exposed welded-tube tail boom, saddle fuel tanks and skid landing gear. In its UH-13J version, based on the Bell 47J, it had a metal-clad tail boom and fuselage and an enclosed cockpit and cabin.

The H-13 and its military variants were often equipped with medical evacuation panniers, one to each skid, with an acrylic glass shield to protect the patient from wind.

A single 260 hp Lycoming VO-435 piston engine was fitted to the 47G variant. Fuel was fed from two high-mounted external tanks. A single two-bladed rotor with short inertial stabilising minor blades was used on the Sioux.

Variants

Military

YR-13 28 Bell 47A helicopters procured by the United States Army Air Forces for evaluation. The YR-13 was powered by a  Franklin O-335-1 piston engine. 10 of the aircraft were transferred to the U.S. Navy for evaluation as the HTL-1, with two HTL-1s later transferred to US Coast Guard.
YR-13A 3 YR-13 aircraft winterized for cold-weather testing in Alaska. Redesignated YH-13A in 1948.
HTL-2 US Navy equivalent of the commercial Model 47D. 12 built.
HTL-3 US Navy equivalent of the commercial Model 47E, powered by a 200 hp (149 kW) Franklin 6V4-200-C32 engine. Nine built.
H-13B 65 aircraft ordered in 1948 by the U.S. Army. All Army versions were later named Sioux.
YH-13C One H-13B used as engineering testbed. Fitted with skid undercarriage and open, uncovered tailboom.
H-13C 16 H-13B aircraft converted to carry external stretchers in 1952, with skid landing gear and open tail boom of YH-13C.
H-13D Army two-seat version based on commercial model 47D-1, with skid landing gear, stretcher carriers, and Franklin O-335-5 engine. 87 built.
OH-13E H-13D configuration with three-seat aircraft with dual controls. 490 built.
XH-13F/Bell 201  Modified Bell 47G powered by a Continental XT51-T-3 (Turbomeca Artouste) turboshaft. The first Bell helicopter powered by a turbine engine.
OH-13G Three-seater based on commercial model 47-G. Introduced a small elevator on the tailboom. 265 delivered to US Army.
OH-13H/UH-13H Based on 47G-2. Equipped with a 250 hp (186 kW) Lycoming VO-435 engine. At least 453 acquired by US Army. UH-13Hs were used by the U.S. Air Force.
UH-13J Two Bell 47J-1 Rangers acquired by the U.S. Air Force for VIP transport of the U.S. President. Originally designated H-13J.
OH-13K Two converted H-13Hs with a larger diameter rotor and a 225 hp (168 kW) Franklin 6VS-335 engine for test evaluation.
TH-13L Originally designated as the Navy HTL-4.
HTL-5 Utilized a Franklin O-335-5 engine.
TH-13M Incorporated a small movable elevator. Originally designated as the Navy HTL-6.
HH-13QOriginally the HUL-1G, it was used by the U.S. Coast Guard for search and rescue.
UH-13RPowered by an Allison YT63-A-3 turboshaft engine. Original US Navy designation HUL-1M.
OH-13SThree-seat observation helicopter based on 47G-3B to replace the OH-13H. 265 received by US Army.
TH-13TTwo-seat instrument trainer for the U.S. Army based on the 47G-3B-1, powered by 270 hp (201 kW) Lycoming TVO-435-D1B. 411 purchased.
Sioux AH.1
General purpose helicopter for the British Army, 50 built by Agusta (Agusta-Bell 47G-3B1) and 250 built by Westland (Westland-Agusta-Bell 47G-3B1). A small number also used by 3 Commando Brigade Air Squadron of the Royal Marines.
Sioux HT.2
Training helicopter for the Royal Air Force, 15 built by Westland.
Texas Helicopter M74 Wasp
Texas Helicopter Corporation single-seat conversion of OH-13E helicopters for agricultural use, powered by  Lycoming TVO-435-A1E engines. Certified 1976.
Texas Helicopter M74A
Certified 1977.
Texas Helicopter M79S Wasp II
Texas Helicopter Corporation conversion for agricultural use, with tandem seating and stub wing fuel tanks.
Texas Helicopter M79T Jet Wasp II
Texas Helicopter Corporation conversion of Bell 47G helicopters for agricultural use, powered by  Soloy-Allison 250-C20S engines.

Operators

 
 Argentine Army
 Argentine Navy
 Argentine Naval Prefecture
 
 Australian Army
 
 Austrian Air Force
 
 Brazilian Air Force
 
 Royal Canadian Navy
 VX-10 Squadron
 
Chilean Navy
 
Colombian Air Force
 
Air Defense Force
 
Ecuadorian Air Force
 
French Air Force
 National Gendarmerie
 
 Bundesgrenzschutz 
 German Army
 German Air Force

 
Hellenic Air Force
 	
 Honduran Air Force
 
 Icelandic Coast Guard
 
Indonesian Air Force
 
Indian Air Force
 
Italian Air Force
Italian Army
Italian Navy
 
 Jamaica Defence Force
 
 Japan Ground Self Defence Force
 Japan Maritime Self Defence Force
 
Royal Malaysian Air Force
 
Maltese Air Wing
 
Mexican Air Force
Mexican Navy

 
 Royal New Zealand Air Force

 Royal Norwegian Air Force
Paraguayan Air Force
 
 Pakistan Army Aviation Corps
 
 Peruvian Air Force
 Peruvian Navy
 
 Philippine Air Force
 
Senegalese Air Force
 
South Vietnam Air Force operated several helicopters since April 1956.
1st Helicopter Squadron
2nd Helicopter Squadron
 
People's Republic of Yemen Air Force
 
Spanish Air Force
Spanish Army
Spanish Navy
 Sri Lanka
 Sri Lanka Air Force
 No.5 Squadron

 Republic of China Army

 Royal Thai Air Force

Turkish Air Force
 

 British Army Army Air Corps

 United States Air Force
 United States Army
 United States Navy
 United States Coast Guard

Uruguayan Air Force
Uruguayan Naval Aviation

Venezuelan Air Force

Zambian Air Force

Surviving aircraft

Canada 
 RCN 1387 – HTL-6 on static display at the Canada Aviation and Space Museum in Ottawa, Ontario.

Germany 
 58-5348 – OH-13H on static display at the Hubschraubermuseum Bückeburg in Bückeburg, Lower Saxony.
 XT548 – Sioux AH.1 on static display at the Flugausstellung Hermeskeil in Hermeskeil, Rhineland-Palatinate.

Pakistan 
 OH-13 on static display at the Pakistan Army Museum in Rawalpindi, Punjab.

South Africa 
 XT562 – Bell 47 on static display at Port Elizabeth Branch of the South African Air Force Museum in Port Elizabeth, Eastern Cape.

South Korea 

 H-13 on static display at the War Memorial of Korea in Seoul.

Spain 
 OH-13H on static display at the Aeronautical Laboratory of the School of Industrial and Aeronautical Engineering of the Polytechnic University of Catalonia in Terrassa, Barcelona.

Taiwan 
 1101 – OH-13H on display at Aviation Education Exhibition Hall, a subsidiary of the Republic of China Air Force Academy.

 2110 – OH-13H on display at Longtan Sports Park at Taoyuan City, Taiwan.

Thailand 
 56-2182/H7-9/15 – OH-13H on display at the Royal Thai Air Force Museum in Bangkok, Thailand.

United Kingdom 
Airworthy
 XT131 (G-CICN) - Sioux AH.1 airworthy with the Historic Army Aircraft Flight based at RAF Middle Wallop.
On display
 XT148 – Sioux AH.1 under restoration at the North East Land, Sea and Air Museums in Sunderland, Tyne and Wear.
 XT190 – Sioux AH.1 on static display at The Helicopter Museum in Weston-super-Mare, Somerset.
 XT200 – Sioux AH.1 on static display at the Newark Air Museum in Newark, Nottinghamshire.

United States 

Airworthy
OH-13H
 58-1528 – operated by Ocean Air Inc. of Eugene, Oregon.
TH-13T
 65-8040 – based at the Cavanaugh Flight Museum in Addison, Texas. It is painted as a H-13D.
On display
H-13B
 48-0796 – South Carolina Military Museum in Columbia, South Carolina. It is the first H-13B airframe, serial number 101, and came off the production line in mid-July 1948.
H-13D
 48-0845 – United States Army Aviation Museum in Enterprise, Alabama.
OH-13D
 51-2456 - United States Army Medical Department Museum located on base at Fort Sam Houston, in San Antonio, Texas.
OH-13E
 51-13934 – Evergreen Aviation & Space Museum in McMinnville, Oregon.
 51-14010 – U.S. Army Transportation Museum at Joint Base Langley–Eustis near Newport News, Virginia.
 51-14062 or 51-14077 – Aviation Hall of Fame and Museum of New Jersey in Teterboro, New Jersey.
 51-14175 – Yanks Air Museum in Chino, California.
 51-14193 – United States Army Aviation Museum in Enterprise, Alabama.
 51-14218 – United States Army Aviation Museum in Enterprise, Alabama.
OH-13G
 52-7833 – Wings of Freedom Aviation Museum in Horsham, Pennsylvania.
H-13H
 58-1520 – South Dakota Air and Space Museum in Box Elder, South Dakota.
OH-13H
 59-4949 - in use as instructional airframe at Portland Community College in Portland, Oregon.
UH-13H
 56-2217 – Castle Air Museum in Atwater, California.
OH-13S
 63-9085 – Texas Air & Space Museum in Amarillo, Texas. It wears a "M*A*S*H" paint scheme and is on loan from Amarillo College.
 64-15338 – Flying Leatherneck Aviation Museum in San Diego, California.
 64-15393 – Intrepid Sea, Air & Space Museum in New York, New York.
TH-13T
 67-15963 – Pueblo Weisbrod Aircraft Museum in Pueblo, Colorado. It has a "M*A*S*H" paint scheme.
 67-17053 – Hill Aerospace Museum in Ogden, Utah.
HTL-2
 122952 – Pima Air & Space Museum in Tucson, Arizona.
HTL-4
 128911 – National Museum of Naval Aviation in Pensacola, Florida.
HTL-6
 142377 – National Museum of Naval Aviation in Pensacola, Florida.
 142394 – Flying Leatherneck Aviation Museum in San Diego, California.
HTL-7
 145842 – Pima Air & Space Museum in Tucson, Arizona.
Unknown
 Fantasy of Flight in Polk City, Florida has an airworthy XH-13F.
 U.S. Veterans Memorial Museum, Huntsville, Alabama has an H-13D on display.

Specifications (Sioux AH.1)

Popular culture

The H-13 has appeared, and played key roles, in many film and television productions. It has been associated with both the M*A*S*H TV series (1972–1983) and the film of the same name (1970), prominently featuring the H-13 in its opening credits, and played a central role in the series finale, which still holds the 
record as the highest rated single episode broadcast in America. The series helped popularize the H-13 as the helicopter most people now associate with the Korean War. The H-13 also played a key role in the Whirlybirds TV series (1957–1959).

See also

Notes

References

Footnotes

Bibliography
 
 
 

 
 
 

 

 

United States, Headquarters Department of the Army, Army Concept Team in Vietnam. Final Report of Essential Load of Scout Helicopters. Saigon, Vietnam: Army Concept Team in Vietnam, 1966.

External links

 Bell 47.net
 
Model 47G specs from The International Directory of Civil Aircraft by Gerard Frawley

United States military helicopters
1960s British military utility aircraft
1940s United States military utility aircraft
Sioux
Agusta aircraft
1940s United States helicopters
H-013
Single-engined piston helicopters
Aircraft first flown in 1947